Cann Hall is a ward, and former civil parish, in the south of Leytonstone in the London Borough of Waltham Forest. It is north of Stratford and Forest Gate, east of Leyton, and west of Wanstead Flats, the southernmost tip of Epping Forest.

History

The Domesday Book of 1086 lists the landowner as Hugh de Montfort, Lord of Montfort-sur-Risle, whose family took possession of a great deal of land after the Norman conquest.  His daughter Adela gave the holding to the canons of Holy Trinity, Aldgate in 1121, and it is likely that the later name of the manor is a contraction of "Canons Hall".

The priory at Holy Trinity retained Cann Hall until the Dissolution of the Monasteries by King Henry VIII in 1532.  The only buildings attached to the farm at that time were two old barns and a little cottage, but nevertheless several petitions were made to the crown for ownership.  Bought by one Nicholas Sympson, the manor then passed through a succession of short-lived ownerships until 1671, when it was sold to William Colegrave for £2750.

 
The Colegrave family continued to hold Cann Hall as a country estate in the early 19th century.  Its tenants were among those whose livestock was permitted to graze on the adjacent Wanstead Flats, which at the time belonged to The Crown.  With others they fought against the buying up of the Flats by private landowners, but in 1851-2 they lost part of the Flats in a protracted legal battle (though later much of the land was saved for the public, and is now administered by the City of London Corporation).

By the 1860s the original cottage had become an enlarged residence with ornamental gardens situated to the south of Cann Hall Road, and the buildings north of the road were known as Cann Hall Farm.  None of these buildings has survived.  Most of the estate was sold for development in 1880–95, though the Colegraves retained part of it until 1900.

The area has become a built-up part of north-east London, consisting largely of late Victorian and early 20th century terraced housing.  Some of the street names retain a link with the past:  Colegrave Road, Selby Road, Manbey Street (all associated with the Colegrave family) - and halfway along Cann Hall Road is the Colegrave Arms pub which is now turning into a mosque.

Cann Hall was anciently part of the parish of Wanstead. It was included in the area of the Leyton urban sanitary district. The population in 1901 was 22,232 and by 1951 it had dropped to 14,424. The parish was abolished in 1965.

Politics

Transport and locale
Nearby places
 Leyton
 Stratford
 Maryland
 Forest Gate
 Wanstead Flats

The nearest London Underground station is Leytonstone on the Central line.

Nearest railway station
 Maryland railway station
 Forest Gate railway station
 Leytonstone High Road railway station

References

External links
 My Cann Hall, Waltham Forest Council page
 Cann Hall Mosque: Wanstead Manors
 British History Online: Wanstead Manors

Areas of London
Districts of the London Borough of Waltham Forest